The Kızlaç Tunnel, is a motorway tunnel constructed on the Adana–Şanlıurfa motorway    in Osmaniye Province, southern Turkey.

It is situated on the Taurus Mountains near Kızlaç village of Bahçe, Osmaniye. The -long twin-tube tunnel carrying three lanes of traffic in each direction is flanked by -long Ayran Tunnel in the west and -long Aslanlı Tunnel in the east on the same motorway. Dangerous goods carriers are not permitted to use the tunnel. 

The tunnel was constructed by Tekfen in New Austrian Tunnelling method (NATM).

See also
List of motorway tunnels in Turkey

References

External links

Road tunnels in Turkey
Transport in Osmaniye Province